No. 8 Squadron  (Eight Pursoots) is a fighter squadron and is equipped with Su-30MKIs and based at Bareilly AFS.

History
No. 8 Squadron were formed in 1943 at Tiruchirapalli and were trained at Peshawar and Bhopal. On 2 December 1943, they were moved to Doublemooring in Chittagong (now in Bangladesh) to work closely together with No. 82 Squadron RAF in the Burma Campaign. Equipped with Spitfires they had significant success against the Japanese Imperial Army.

Assignments
Burma Campaign
Indo-Pakistani War of 1965
Indo-Pakistani War of 1971

Aircraft

References

008
Military units and formations of India in World War II
1943 establishments in India